Bogdan Bogdanov (in Bulgarian: Богдан Богданов), 1940-2016, is a Bulgarian classical philologist, culturologist and translator. Bogdanov is the president of New Bulgarian University and chairman of the Board of Trustees of NBU. He is professor of ancient Greek literature and culture at the University of Sofia.

Bogdanov was born in Sofia on 2 November 1940. He graduated from the Classical Philology Department of the University of Sofia in 1963 and later specialized at the University of Athens (1978) and Amsterdam University (1984). 
In 1978–1988 Bogdanov was a secret informer of Department VI of the Bulgarian Interior Ministry (the Communist political police), but the fact was officially acknowledged only 20 years later.

The two decades after the fall of communism in Bulgaria, were particularly successful for Bogdanov. In 1990 he founded with other intellectuals and become chairman of the Society for New Bulgarian University and co-founded Open Society Fund (in Bulgaria). In 1991 he founded New Bulgarian University — the first private university in the country — as successor to the Society for New Bulgarian University (after a resolution by Bulgarian Parliament on September 18, 1991). He was the ambassador of the Republic of Bulgaria to Greece (1991–1993).

Bogdanov published numerous essays and monographs in Bulgarian but few of his writings have been translated into other languages. In 2010 Reading and its Functioning. From ancient Greek literature to anyone world was published in Berlin.

Bogdanov died in Sofia on August 5, 2016.

References 

 Bogdan Bogdanov, Biography

External links
 Bogdan Bogdanov personal website

New Bulgarian University
Bulgarian translators
Bulgarian literary critics
 Grand Crosses of the Order of the Phoenix (Greece)
1940 births
2016 deaths
20th-century translators